The 1974 Bucknell Bison football team was an American football team that represented Bucknell University as an independent during the 1974 NCAA Division II football season.

In their sixth and final year under head coach Fred Prender, the Bison compiled a 2–8 record. Mike Axe and Larry Schoeneberger were the team captains. 

Bucknell played its home games at Memorial Stadium on the university campus in Lewisburg, Pennsylvania.

Schedule

References

Bucknell
Bucknell Bison football seasons
Bucknell Bison football